Max Reisch (1912–1985) was an Austrian long-distance motorcyclist and author who made what is called the first overland journey to India (from Europe) in 1933. Reisch published ten travel narratives about his time in India, other Asian countries, and Africa.

Bibliography

In film

References

External links
Max Reisch page

Long-distance motorcycle riders
Motorcycle touring writers
1912 births
Austrian travel writers
1985 deaths
People from Kufstein
World record setters in motorcycling